The Cranberry River is a tributary of the Gauley River located in southeastern West Virginia in the United States.

The river has also been known historically as Cranberry Creek. The river was named for cranberry bogs along its course.

Geography
The Cranberry River is formed in southwestern Pocahontas County by the confluence of its North and South forks.

Below the confluence of its forks, the Cranberry flows for  generally westward towards its mouth at the Gauley River near Craigsville.

The Cranberry River has several pay campgrounds, free campsites, and picnic areas along its banks.

Fishing
Fish biomass production was reduced three fold and fish diversity was cut almost in half between 1957 and 1987 in the Cranberry River watershed. Although causality was never established, this was attributed to acidification from atmospheric deposition of nitric and sulfuric acid. Flow-driven liming stations were established on the Dogway Fork in 1988 and in 1993 on the North Fork just above its confluence with the South Fork of the Cranberry River. A fishable brook trout population and 13 macroinvertebrate species have been restored to the Dogway Fork since liming has begun. Smallmouth bass and rock bass have been reestablished in the treated part of the river and numbers have increased in the lower reaches.

The Cranberry River and its small tributaries are regarded as some of the finest trout streams in the eastern United States. Until recently, however, trout fishing on the south fork was limited to the lower half of the river due to acid rain.  The West Virginia Division of Natural Resources has worked to counter this problem by installing a liming station on the north fork of the river.

Flow rate
A USGS stream gauge on the creek near Richwood recorded a mean annual discharge of  during water years 1945-2019.

See also
List of West Virginia rivers

External links
Monongahela National Forest map of the Richwood area, including the course of the Cranberry River and recreational amenities along its banks
Real-time water data for the Cranberry River

References

Rivers of West Virginia
Monongahela National Forest
Rivers of Nicholas County, West Virginia
Rivers of Pocahontas County, West Virginia
Rivers of Webster County, West Virginia